Le Petit Robert de la Langue Française, known as just Petit Robert, is a popular single-volume French dictionary first published by Paul Robert in 1967. It is an abridgement of his eight-volume Dictionnaire alphabétique et analogique de la langue française.

, it is in its fourth edition and is available in both print and electronic forms.
It is also widely used across European nations.
It is published by Dictionnaires Le Robert.

References

External links
  

French dictionaries